SS Arabia was an ocean liner operated by Cunard. She was the last wooden-hulled ship built for the Cunard Line. On January 1, 1853, she departed on her maiden voyage with 60 passengers and 1,200 tons of coal. She was a luxurious ship for her time, with the saloon having a stained glass dome, and crimson velvet sofas.
In 1858 enroute to New York, she collided with the Cunarder 'Europa' with minor damage, and continued her voyage.
She was sold in 1865 to Robert Duncan, sold in 1866 to the Anglo-Egyptian Navigation Company of London, and scrapped in 1867.

References 

Ships of the Cunard Line

1852 ships